The canton of Chantonnay is an administrative division of the Vendée department, western France. Its borders were modified at the French canton reorganisation which came into effect in March 2015. Its seat is in Chantonnay.

It consists of the following communes:
 
Le Boupère
Bournezeau
Chantonnay
Essarts-en-Bocage
La Ferrière
Fougeré
La Merlatière
Rochetrejoux
Sainte-Cécile
Saint-Germain-de-Prinçay
Saint-Hilaire-le-Vouhis
Saint-Martin-des-Noyers
Saint-Prouant
Saint-Vincent-Sterlanges
Sigournais
Thorigny

References

Cantons of Vendée